Hatay Province is the southernmost province in Turkey

Hatay may also refer to:

 Hatay State or Republic of Hatay, a 1938–1939 transnational political entity
 Hatay Subregion, an area of Turkey comprising Hatay, Kahramanmaraş, and Osmaniye Provinces
 Hatay (electoral district), a constituency of the Grand National Assembly of Turkey
 Hatay Airport, in Hatay Province
 Hatay, Konak, a district of İzmir, Turkey
 Hatay (İzmir Metro), a railway station

See also
 Hà Tây Province, Vietnam